This article lists the townships of Quebec in Canada. The townships no longer represent administrative divisions recognized by the Ministry of Municipal Affairs and Housing (Quebec) (MAMH). Only municipal townships, formed from one or more townships, such as township municipalities and united township municipalities, are recognized. Many geographic townships are still conterminous with municipalities.

See also
 List of township municipalities in Quebec
 List of united township municipalities in Quebec

References 

Local government in Quebec